Ryan Davis (born January 20, 2000) is an American professional basketball player who last played for the Landstede Hammers of the BNXT League. He played college basketball for the Vermont Catamounts and was named the America East Player of the Year in 2021 and 2022.

High school career
Davis attended James B. Conant High School in Hoffman Estates, Illinois. As a senior, he averaged 25 points and 11 rebounds per game. Davis left as his school's all-time leading scorer with 1,536 points. He committed to playing college basketball for Vermont.

College career
Davis averaged 3.3 points in 10.2 minutes per game as a freshman at Vermont. He suffered from plantar fasciitis during the season. In the offseason, Davis improved his quickness by losing 25 lbs (11.3 kg). As a sophomore, he averaged 9.5 points and 4.4 rebounds per game, earning America East Sixth Man of the Year honors. In his junior season, Davis moved into a leading role with the departures of Anthony Lamb and other key seniors. On December 28, 2020, he scored 27 points, shooting 11-of-14 from the field, in an 81–80 loss to NJIT in double overtime. On February 25, 2021, Davis was named the America East Player of the Year. He averaged 18.5 points and 6.3 rebounds per game as a junior. Davis was again named America East Player of the Year as a senior.

Professional career 
On July 8, 2022, Davis signed his first professional contract with Dutch club Landstede Hammers of the BNXT League.

Career statistics

College

|-
| style="text-align:left;"| 2018–19
| style="text-align:left;"| Vermont
| 24 || 2 || 10.2 || .388 || .214 || .923 || 1.8 || .3 || .0 || .3 || 3.3
|-
| style="text-align:left;"| 2019–20
| style="text-align:left;"| Vermont
| 31 || 3 || 20.0 || .530 || .302 || .830 || 4.4 || .5 || .4 || .5 || 9.5
|-
| style="text-align:left;"| 2020–21
| style="text-align:left;"| Vermont
| 13 || 13 || 27.2 || .586 || .415 || .810 || 6.3 || 1.1 || .5 || .6 || 18.5
|-
| style="text-align:left;"| 2021–22
| style="text-align:left;"| Vermont
| 30 || 30 || 26.4 || .593 || .441 || .771 || 5.6 || 1.3 || .2 || .8 || 17.3
|- class="sortbottom"
| style="text-align:center;" colspan="2"| Career
| 98 || 48 || 20.5 || .554 || .372 || .803 || 4.4 || .8 || .3 || .5 || 11.6

References

External links
Vermont Catamounts bio

2000 births
Living people
American expatriate basketball people in the Netherlands
American men's basketball players
Basketball players from Illinois
Landstede Hammers players
People from Schaumburg, Illinois
Power forwards (basketball)
Vermont Catamounts men's basketball players